Rabe is a German surname meaning "raven" and may refer to:

 David Rabe (born 1940), American playwright and screenwriter
 Eckard Rabe (born 1948), South African actor
 Eugene Rabe (1911–1974), German-American astronomer
 Folke Rabe (1935–2017), Swedish composer
 Florence Bates (born Rabe, 1888–1954) American actress
 Hugo Rabe (1867–1932), German classical philologist
 Jean Rabe (born 1957), fantasy and science fiction author and editor 
 John Rabe (1882–1950), German businessman who rescued more than 200,000 Chinese during the World War II Nanjing Massacre
 Josh Rabe (born 1978), former Major League Baseball player
 Jutta Rabe (born 1955), German journalist
 Karin Rabe, Swedish orienteering competitor
 Karin M. Rabe, American physicist
 Karl Rabe (1895–1968), automobile designer and Chief Designer at Porsche
 Laurentius Corvinus (Laurentius Rabe in German) (1465–1527), Silesian scholar and poet
 Lily Rabe (born 1982), American actress
 Margarete Rabe (born 1923), German World War II concentration camp guard
 Pamela Rabe (born 1959), Canadian/Australian actor and theatre director
 Peter Rabe (1921–1990), German-American writer, mostly of crime fiction
 Sascha Rabe (born 1985), German ice dancer
 Stephen G. Rabe, American historian and professor
 Thomas Rabe (born 1951), German professor of gynaecology and obstetrics
 Wilhelm F. Rabe (1893–1958), German astronomer

See also
 Raabe

German-language surnames
Surnames from nicknames